These defunct field events were once contested in previous Paralympic Games in which both men and women competed in various classes.

Men's events

Football accuracy and distance
Football accuracy and distance were contested once in the 1976 Summer Paralympics.

Pentathlon

Men
The men's event scheduled between 1960 to 2008.
Wheelchair athletes

Precision club throw
Precision club throw was contested between 1976 to 1984

Precision javelin
Precision javelin was contested at seven Games from 1960 to Athletics at the 1988 Summer Paralympics. It was absent in the 1964 Summer Paralympics.

Triple jump
This event was for men only and was contested from 1980 to 2012. They mainly competed by blind athletes or athletes with amputations.

Blind athletes

Amputee athletes

Women's events

Pentathlon
The women's competition scheduled between 1968 to 2000
Wheelchair athletes

Precision javelin throw

See also
Defunct Paralympic track events

References

Defunct events at the Summer Paralympics
Athletics at the Summer Paralympics